State Route 32 (SR 32) is a state highway in East Tennessee. For most of its route, it is an unsigned companion route concurrent with U.S. Route 25E (US 25E). The highway stretches 89 miles from the North Carolina state line to the Tennessee-Kentucky state line near the town of Cumberland Gap.

From the junction with US 25W-US 70 in Newport to the Kentucky-Tennessee state line at the Cumberland Gap, SR 32 is designated as the East Tennessee Crossing Byway, a National Scenic Byway. SR 32 is also designated as Appalachian Development Highway System (ADHS) Corridor S. The corridor follows SR 32 between I-81 in Morristown and State Route 63 (ADHS Corridor F) in Harrogate.

Route description

Cocke County
SR 32 begins as a paved continuation of a North Carolina secondary highway (Mt. Sterling Road, a narrow gravel road), in the Cherokee National Forest in Cocke County, at the Tennessee-North Carolina state line, just north of Great Smoky Mountains National Park. SR 32 winds its way west through the Appalachian Mountains, along the southern border of the forest, for 11 miles, where it crosses the Appalachian Trail, before leaving the mountains and entering town of Cosby, where it comes to an intersection and becomes concurrent with US 321/SR 73. Many compare this stretch of SR 32 to the Tail of the Dragon due to its many curves and switchbacks.

The highway turns north as it passes by several homes and businesses, while having intersections with the Foothills Parkway and with SR 339, just a few hundred feet from each other. Leaving Cosby, the three routes head north through farmland to an intersection with Wilton Springs Road, where SR 73 splits off to the east toward I-40. SR 32/US 321 continues through farmland as a newly improved 2-lane highway before entering Newport and widening to a 4-lane divided highway, just before turning east and having an interchange with I-40 (Exit 435).

SR 32/US 321 then runs through a heavily congested retail area and becomes undivided. Upon entering downtown, it junctions with US 70/US 25/SR 9 (W Broadway Street), where US 321 splits off and goes east into downtown while SR 32 becomes unsigned and concurrent with US 25/US 70/SR 9 west. They then pass by several businesses before coming to the US 25 split for US 25W/US 25E, where SR 32 splits off to follow US 25E north and they leave Newport as a 2-lane highway. This concurrency continues through countryside before crossing the J. W. Walters Bridge over Douglas Lake/French Broad River and enter Jefferson County.

Jefferson County
US 25E/SR 32 continues north through countryside and farmland to enter White Pine along State Street, and has an intersection with SR 341. These concurrent highways then pass by several homes and businesses before becoming concurrent with SR 113, which provides access to downtown. US 25E, SR 32, and SR 113 then leave White Pine and continue north through farmland and crosses into Hamblen County.

Hamblen County

The highway then widens to a 4-lane divided highway shortly before having an interchange with I-81 (Exit 8). The highway then enters Morristown and passes through an industrial area and has an intersection with SR 343, shortly before SR 113 splits off to the northeast. US 25E/SR 32 then bypass downtown to the east through wooded areas as it becomes a freeway and has its first interchange with SR 160 (Exit 1). The freeway then continues to an interchange with Crockett Square Drive/Walter State CC Drive (Exit 1A; provides access to Walters State Community College and a large retail area). Shortly afterwards they become concurrent with US 11E/SR 34 (Morris Boulevard) at Exit 2A, which quickly ends at Exit 2B with SR 66 (Andrew Johnson Highway). US 25E/SR 32 then downgrade to a divided highway as it passes through several neighborhoods before having an interchange with SR 343, just before crossing the Olen R. Marshall Memorial Bridge over Cherokee Lake/Holston River, where they leave Morristown and cross into Grainger County.

Grainger County

US 25E/SR 32 continues north past several lakefront homes and businesses before entering Bean Station and having a junction with SR 375 (Lake Shore Road). It then bypasses downtown, to the west, and has an interchange and becomes concurrent with US 11W/SR 1. It then curves to the west and passes by several homes and businesses before coming to another interchange, where US 11W/SR 1 splits off to the west while US 25E/SR 32 curves back to the north and leaves Bean Station. The highway then curves through, and climbs to, the crest of the Clinch Mountain range, just before entering Thorn Hill, where it intersects with SR 131. The highway then continues north to cross a bridge over the Clinch River and crosses into Claiborne County.

Claiborne County
US 25E/SR 32 then becomes undivided and gains a center turn as they turn northwest, where they join and begin an unsigned wrong-way concurrency with SR 33, just after crossing an arm of Norris Lake (Big Sycamore Creek). The highway then continues through countryside and farmland to the community of Springdale before curving around through a gap between two ridges and entering Tazewell. They bypass downtown to the east side before coming to an intersection with N Broad Street just on the north side, where SR 33 and goes south towards downtown and New Tazewell while US 25E/SR 32  turn north again. They have an intersection with SR 345 shortly afterwards before passing by several businesses before leaving Tazewell not too long afterwards.

Traveling northwest out of Tazewell, US 25E/SR 32 passes through countryside and farmland to cross the Powell River before becoming divided, shortly before entering Harrogate and have a junction, and brief concurrency with SR 63, shortly before passing by Lincoln Memorial University and going through downtown. The highway then leaves Harrogate and crosses a ridge before entering the town of Cumberland Gap, where they bypass downtown to the southwest and have an interchange with US 58/SR 383. The highway then continues north to the Cumberland Gap Tunnel at the Tennessee-Kentucky state line, where SR 32 ends and US 25E continues north into Kentucky.

Major intersections

References

032
Transportation in Cocke County, Tennessee
Transportation in Jefferson County, Tennessee
Transportation in Hamblen County, Tennessee
Transportation in Grainger County, Tennessee
Transportation in Claiborne County, Tennessee
Morristown, Tennessee
Harrogate, Tennessee
Cumberland Gap